Ejura Sekyedumase Municipal District is one of the forty-three districts in Ashanti Region, Ghana. Originally created as an ordinary district assembly in 1988 as Ejura Sekyedumase District, which it was created from parts of the former Sekyere District and Offinso District Councils. Later, it has elevated to municipal district assembly status on 28 June 2012. The municipality is located in the northern part of Ashanti Region and has Ejura as its capital town.

References

Sources
 
 GhanaDistricts.com

Districts of Ashanti Region